Global Balalaika Show is a 2003 live album by the Leningrad Cowboys celebrating the 10th anniversary of the Total Balalaika Show.  The Concert was also filmed and broadcast on Yle and released on DVD.

Track listing

Personnel
The Leningrad Cowboys:
Juuso Hannukainen - percussion
Tipe Johnson - vocals
Sakke Järvenpää - vocals
Sami Järvenpää - vocals
Jay Kortehisto - Trombone
Marzi Nyman - Guitar
Pemo Ojala - trumpet
Pope Puolitaival - tenor sax
Mauri Sumén - keyboards, accordion
Timo Tolonen - Bass
Tume Uusitalo - Guitar, vocals
Varre Vartiainen - guitar

Very special guest stars:
Red Army Air Force Ensemble
Alexander Druzhinin - Conductor
Alexandre Semaka - Choir Master
Evgueni Korotev - Choir Master
Alla Surich - Ballet Master
Larisa Chernoskova - Soloist
UMO Jazz Orchestra
Angélique Kidjo
The Wild Magnolias
Yamar & the Galaxy
Johanna Rusanen
Juan de la Cruz Antomarchi "Coto"
Zsar Aleksander II

References

Leningrad Cowboys albums
2003 live albums